, professionally known as , is a Japanese folk singer.

Born in Amami Ōshima, Japan, she began to sing traditional Japanese music when she was four years old.  Later, at the age of 15, Rikki was the youngest winner ever to win the "Grand Prix" of the Japanese traditional folk music awards (known as All Japan Minyo awards).  She first performed in Tokyo, Japan, at the prestigious Festival Konda Lota in 1992.  She released her first single "Maten no Hoshi" (which means 'Sky Full of Stars') in December 1993, originally released in the Kyūshū region of Japan.  Shortly thereafter, she produced her debut album, .

In 1998, Rikki was chosen to participate at the opening ceremony of the 1998 Winter Paralympics in Nagano, Japan, to sing the Paralympics theme song "".

Rikki sang the Final Fantasy X main theme, "Suteki da ne", released as a single on July 18, 2001. The single also included an instrumental version of "", "Pure Heart" (a vocal arrangement of Aeris' Theme from Final Fantasy VII), and a new song entitled "" (which means 'The Moon').

In 2001, she produced a picture album alongside Joe Hisaishi for the motion picture Spirited Away (directed by Hayao Miyazaki).

In 2006, Rikki joined the band Sound Horizon for the release of 5th Story CD: Roman.
She was involved in Sound Horizon's releases until 2008, when she gave birth to twins and returned to Amami Ōshima, as she said in her blog. She returned to Sound Horizon in 2009 for their Triumph III live tour. She also returned to Sound Horizon in 2015 for their newest album to date, 9th Story Nein.

Discography

Albums
  (21 May 1993) – re-released on 21 August 2002
  (16 December 1993)
  (24 August 1994)
  (16 December 1995)
 Miss You Amami (15 November 1998) – re-released in the UK on 15 June 2004
  (3 October 2001)
  (21 August 2002)
  (25 September 2002)
  (19 January 2005)

Singles
 "" (1 December 1993)
 "" (1 May 1994)
 "Suteki da ne" – featured in Final Fantasy X (18 July 2001), re-released by Square Enix on 22 July 2004
 "" (19 March 2003)

References

External links
 Rikki Official Website
 
 
 Another biography about Ritsuki Nakano

1975 births
Japanese folk singers
Living people
Musicians from Kagoshima Prefecture
Video game musicians
20th-century Japanese women singers
20th-century Japanese singers
21st-century Japanese women singers
21st-century Japanese singers
People from the Amami Islands